Yan Xing (Chinese characters: 鄢醒, born 1986) is an artist known for performance, installation, video and photography. He grew up in Chongqing and currently lives and works in Beijing and Los Angeles.

Early life and education 
Yan Xing was born in Chongqing in 1986. He studied at the Oil Painting Department of Sichuan Fine Arts Institute from 2005 to 2009. After receiving his B.A., he moved to Beijing.

Artistic career 
Yan Xing is known for his interdisciplinary projects which have built a complex, compelling body of work that reflects critically on how history is manufactured today. He interrogates literature, history, and history of art. His work explores themes of negativity, resistance and order and the complexity of their connectivity. Yan Xing’s works involve an extremely broad range of media, including performance, video, photography, installation, and painting, among others.

Yan Xing’s career in art began with Daddy Project (2011), it was an hour-long performance he gave an account of his absent “father”. The work was first performed in a group exhibition curated by Carol Yinghua Lu, art critic Holland Cotter wrote in the New York Times: “First-person public exposure of a personal life, particularly related to family, is relatively rare in China, and Mr. Yan has become a controversial star.” The first institutional solo exhibition of his works was held on 2012 at Chinese Arts Centre, Manchester, UK; On 2016, his first solo exhibition in America opened at Eli and Edythe Broad Art Museum at Michigan State University in East Lansing, Michigan. From June 2 through August 27, 2017, the Kunsthalle Basel presented Yan Xing: Dangerous Afternoon, curated by Elena Filipovic, this was the artist's first institutional solo exhibition in Switzerland.

Yan Xing has exhibited and performed extensively, at institutions such as the Stedelijk Museum Amsterdam; Contemporary Arts Museum Houston; Ullens Center for Contemporary Art (UCCA), Beijing; OCT Contemporary Art Terminal (OCAT), Shenzhen and the Power Station of Art, Shanghai. He has also been featured at 7th Shenzhen Sculpture Biennale (2012); 3rd Moscow International Biennale for Young Art (2012) and 3rd Ural Industrial Biennial of Contemporary Art (2015).

Yan Xing is both the initiator and a participant of artists’ collective COMPANY. His works have been public collections include: Rubell Family Collection, Miami; M+ Museum for Visual Culture, Hong Kong; Kadist Art Foundation, Paris; He Xiangning Art Museum, Shenzhen. Yan Xing has also curated exhibitions such as: Dream Plant, Sichuan Fine Arts Institute, Chongqing; Mummery, Art Channel, Beijing; and the Fact Study Institute, Yangtze River Space, Wuhan.

Exhibitions

Selected solo exhibitions 

 2017
Dangerous Afternoon, Kunsthalle Basel, Basel, Switzerland
 2016
Yan Xing, Eli and Edythe Broad Art Museum, Michigan State University, East Lansing, Michigan, US
 2015
Thief, Galerie Urs Meile, Beijing, China
 2013
Recent Works, Galerie Urs Meile, Beijing, China
 2012
Yan Xing, Chinese Arts Centre, Manchester, UK
 2011
Realism, Galerie Urs Meile, Beijing, China

Selected group exhibitions 

 2017
Spectrosynthesis, Museum of Contemporary Art Taipei, Taipei, Taiwan
 2016
Sui Generis, Tenuta Dello Scompiglio, Capannori, Italy
 De leur temps 5: Le temps de L’audace et de l’engagement, Institut d’Art Contemporain, Villeurbanne, France
 We Chat: A Dialogue in Contemporary Chinese Art, Ezra and Cecile Zilkha Gallery, Center for the Arts, Wesleyan University, Middletown, Connecticut, US
 2015
Teetering at the Edge of the World, Espacio de Arte Contemporáneo, Montevideo, Uruguay
 Chercher le garçon, Musée d’Art Contemporain du Val-de-Marne, Vitry-sur-Seine, France
 Traveling Alone, Tromsø Kunstforening, Tromsø, Norway
 2014
My Generation: Young Chinese Artists, Tampa Museum of Art, Tampa, Florida, US. Travelled to Oklahoma City Museum of Art, Oklahoma City, Oklahoma, US, 2014; Orange County Museum of Art, Newport Beach, California, US, 2015
 The 8 of Paths, Uferhallen, Berlin, Germany
 2013
28 Chinese, Rubell Family Collection, Miami, Florida, US. Travelled to Asian Art Museum, San Francisco, California, US, 2015; San Antonio Museum of Art, San Antonio, Texas, US, 2015
 Unlimited, Art Basel, Messe Basel, Messeplatz, Basel, Switzerland
 Future Generation Art Prize, Collateral Event of the 55th Venice Biennale, Palazzo Contarini Polignac, Venice, Italy
 China China, Pinchuk Art Centre, Kiev, Ukraine
 ON | OFF: China’s Young Artists in Concept and Practice, Ullens Center for Contemporary Art, Beijing, China
 2012
Unfinished Country: New Video from China, Contemporary Arts Museum Houston, Houston, Texas, US
 Becoming Peninsula I: Symptoms, Iberia Center for Contemporary Art, Beijing, China

Awards 
As a young artist, Yan Xing made an impressive result during recent years. He has received several notable awards, in 2012 he won the Best Young Artist Award by Chinese Contemporary Art Award (CCAA). The same year, he was a finalist in the Future Generation Art Prize by Victor Pinchuk Foundation and Focus on Talents Project from Today Art Museum.

References

External links 
 
 Yan Xing: Dangerous Afternoon at Kunsthalle Basel
Yan Xing at Eli and Edythe Broad Art Museum at Michigan State University
Yan Xing at Kadist Art Foundation
Yan Xing at Rubell Family Collection

1986 births
Living people
Chinese contemporary artists
Chinese performance artists
Chinese video artists
Conceptual artists
Chinese gay artists
Artists from Chongqing
Sichuan Fine Arts Institute alumni